Overlord is a combat flight simulator by Rowan Software. It was released in 1994 for Amiga and PC MS-DOS platforms.

Gameplay
It is based on Operation Overlord, the Allied invasion of continental Europe during World War II. The player is tasked with flying a series of historically accurate missions for the Royal Air Force, flying Spitfire IX, Hawker Typhoon, and Mustang III aircraft.

Reception
Next Generation reviewed the PC version of the game, rating it three stars out of five, and stated that "D-Day: Operation Overlord doesn't play any better than other flight sims that are already available [...] This title is strictly for WW II buffs or flight-sim fanatics."

Reviews
PC Format (Dec, 1995)
Amiga Power (Nov, 1994)
Amiga Format (Dec, 1994)
The One Amiga (Jan, 1995)
CU Amiga (Feb, 1995)
ASM (Aktueller Software Markt) (Sep, 1994)
Power Play (Aug, 1994)
MikroBitti (Sep, 1994)
Amiga Joker (Jan, 1995)
Australian Commodore and Amiga Review (Oct, 1995)

References

External links

1994 video games
Amiga games
DOS games
Video games developed in the United Kingdom
World War II flight simulation video games
Rowan Software games
Single-player video games